The Harkness Ballet (1964–1975) was a New York ballet company named after its founder Rebekah Harkness.  Harkness inherited her husband's fortune in Standard Oil holdings, and was a dance lover. Harkness funded Joffrey Ballet, but when they refused to rename the company in her honour, she withdrew funding and hired most of the Joffrey dancers for her new company. Joffrey Ballet later moved to Chicago, and continues to function.

Background
Harkness Ballet, established in 1964, gave its debut performance in Cannes in 1965, with George Skibine as director, Marjorie Tallchief as ballerina and a repertory featuring work by Alvin Ailey, Skibine, Eric Bruhn, Brian Macdonald and Stuart Hodes, the company mostly toured abroad, in the major theaters of Europe, to great acclaim, giving its dancers and choreographers a cosmopolitan experience unknown to most of their American colleagues. Its New York debut was in 1967 and Macdonald was also appointed director, succeeded by Lawrence Rhodes (1968) and joined by Benjamin Harkarvy in 1969. The ballet teacher David Howard was recruited in 1966 and became co-director of the school in 1971 with Maria Vegh, who had begun teaching at the school in 1968. In 1970, Harkness combined it with the Harkness Youth Ballet (founded 1969), directed by Ben Stevenson, succeeded by Vicente Nebrada.

In 1972, Harkness purchased an historic theatre (Colonial Theatre, built in 1905) across from Lincoln Center and renamed it The Harkness Theater.  The theatre was completely remodeled with state-of-the-art dance stage flooring and Spanish artist  Enrique Senis-Oliver painted ceiling murals, opening with a season by the company in 1974. The company disbanded within the next year. The vitality of the dancers was widely admired and many of the ballets were very erotic, including the homoerotic "Sebastian" (1963) to music of Gian-Carlo Menotti, "Monument for a Dead Boy" (1966) by Rudi Van Dantzig (b. 1933) and "Gemini" (1972) by Vicente Nebrada (b. 1930).

The Harkness House for Ballet Arts, housed in the Nathaniel L. McCready House, a four story mansion on Manhattan's Upper East Side, served as the company's headquarters and official school, which continued for many years after the company closed and became the home to the American Dance Machine. Notable Harkness Ballet Trainee scholarship dancers attending the school included Lawrence Leritz and Patrick Swayze.

The Harkness Ballet was managed by Jeannot B. Cerrone from 1964 to 1975.

Notable company dancers

Christopher Aponte
Maria Eglevsky
Barbara Hancock
Lone Isaksen
Judith Jamison
Finis Jhung
Lar Lubovitch
Lawrence Rhodes
Brunilda Ruiz
Helgi Tomasson

References

External links
Richard Holden biography "Rebekah Harkness Builds Her Own Theater"
Time Magazine: "Angels In Tights"
Harkness Ballet Blog

Ballet companies in the United States
1964 establishments in New York City
1975 disestablishments in New York (state)
Performing groups established in 1964
Dance companies in New York City